Lisitsyno is a rural locality (a settlement) in Filippovskoye Rural Settlement, Kirzhachsky District, Vladimir Oblast, Russia. The population was 3 as of 2010. There are 3 streets.

Geography 
Lisitsyno is located 17 km southwest of Kirzhach (the district's administrative centre) by road. Melezhi is the nearest rural locality.

References 

Rural localities in Kirzhachsky District